The Yacoubian Building (transliterated: ʿImārat Yaʿqūbīān or Omaret Yakobean) is a 2006 Egyptian film based on the novel of the same title by author Alaa Al Aswany. It has been reported to be the highest-budgeted film in the history of Egyptian cinema.

Background
Like the novel ostensibly set in 1990 at about the time of the first Gulf War, the film is a scathing portrayal of modern Egyptian society since the coup d'état of 1952. The setting is downtown Cairo, with the titular apartment building (which actually exists) serving as both a metaphor for contemporary Egypt and a unifying location in which most of the primary characters either live or work and in which much of the action takes place.

The actual namesake Yacoubian building, constructed in the Art Deco style, still stands in downtown Cairo at the address given in the novel: 34 Talaat Harb Street (referred to by its old name, Suleiman Basha Street, by both native Cairenes and the novel's characters).  As in the novel, the film's version of the building is "in the high classical European style, the balconies decorated with Greek faces carved in stone."

After premiering at the Berlin Film Festival in 2006, the film opened in Egypt in June.

The Yacoubian Building was Egypt's official submission to the 79th Academy Awards for Best Foreign Language Film.

Plot summary

The film opens with a luff tracing the building's history, as wealthy expatriate and Egyptian residents give way, after the 1952 coup that overthrew King Farouk and eventually resulted in the installation of Gamal Abdel Nasser as President of Egypt, to new families, and as the rooftop storage rooms are converted into living space for lower-class families.   The rooftop community, effectively a slum neighborhood, is symbolic of the urbanization of Egypt and of the burgeoning population growth in its large cities in recent decades, especially among the poor and working classes.  In the faded apartments of the main floors and on the building's teeming roof, the film's principal characters are introduced:
Zaki Pasha el Dessouki (Adel Emam) – a wealthy and elderly foreign-educated engineer who spends most of his time pursuing women and who maintains an office in the Yacoubian, he personifies the ruling class prior to the Revolution: cosmopolitan, cultured, western in outlook, and not particularly observant of Islam
Taha el Shazli (Mohamed Imam) – the son of the building doorman, he excelled in school and hoped to be admitted to the Police Academy but found that his father's profession, considered too lowly by the generals conducting his character interview, was an obstacle to admission; disaffected, he enrolls at the University and eventually joins a militant Islamist organization modeled upon the Jamaa Islamya
Buthayna el Sayed (Hend Sabry) – initially Taha's childhood sweetheart, she is forced to find a job to help support her family after her father dies and is disillusioned to find that her male employer expects sexual favors from her and her female coworkers in exchange for additional money and gifts on the side, and that her mother expects her to preserve her virginity while not refusing her boss's sexual advances outright; embittered, she eventually comes to use her beauty as a tool to advance her own interests but finds herself falling in love with Zaki Bey el Dessouki, whom she'd been planning with Malak to swindle out of his apartment
Malak (Ahmed Bedeir) – a shirtmaker and petty schemer seeking to open a shop on the Yacoubian's roof and then to insinuate himself into one of the more posh apartments downstairs
Hatim Rasheed (Khaled El Sawy) – the son of an Egyptian father who was a noted legal scholar and a French mother, he is the editor of Le Caire, a French-language daily newspaper; more attention is paid to his private life, for he is a fairly open homosexual in a society which either looks the other way or openly condemns such behavior and inclinations
Hagg Muhammad Azzam (Nour El Sherif) – one of Egypt's wealthiest men and a migrant to Cairo from the countryside, in the space of thirty years he has gone from shoeshiner to self-made millionaire; he seeks an acceptable and legal outlet for his (temporarily) resurgent libido in a secret, second marriage to an attractive young widow, and also realizes his goal of serving in the People's Assembly (Parliament), but comes face to face with the enormous corruption, graft, and bribery of contemporary Egyptian politics.
Christine (Yousra) – a world-weary chanteuse who advises Zaki Bey on his love life and whose poignant singing of European songs like "La Vie en Rose" punctuates the film.

The stories of each of the primary characters are intertwined, at times colliding or converging with one another. Together, they give a biting condemnation of a nation that has squandered its promise and which has been forced to compromise its own principles, resulting in a corrupt and undemocratic political system dominated by a single party (the fictitious "Patriotic Party", a thinly-veiled version of Egypt's National Democratic Party).  The unlikely pairing of the elderly roué and the disillusioned young girl that ends the film provides a closing grace note that can be seen as a ray of hope against the death and unhappiness that has befallen the other characters.

Cast
 Adel Emam .. Zaki Pasha
 Nour El-Sherif .. Haj Azzam
 Yousra.. Christine
 Hend Sabri.. Bosaina
 Somaya El Khashab
 Khaled El Sawy .. Hatem Rasheed
 Issad Younis .. Dawlat
 Ahmed Bedeir.. Malak
 Ahmed Rateb
 Khaled Saleh
 Bassem Samra
 Mohamed Emam .. Taha El-Shazli
 Youssef Daoud

Commercial and critical reception

Having received the Adults Only seal from the board of censors in Egypt, the film debuted on June 25 to box office returns of over LE 6,000,000 in its first week, according to Al Ahram daily, giving it the record for the biggest debut ever for a theatrical film in Egypt. It went on to gross LE 20 million during its initial theatrical run.

TV series

After the success of the film in 2006, a television series under the same name of Yacoubian Building was launched in 2007 with a major difference – the gay character in the film and the source novel was excised from the TV series adaptation of the novel because of its controversial nature.

References

Further reading
 Selvick, Stephanie. "Queer (Im)possibilities: Alaa Al-Aswany's and Wahid Hamed's The Yacoubian Building" (Chapter 8). In: Pullen, Christopher. LGBT Transnational Identity and the Media. Palgrave Macmillan. 29 February 2012. , 9780230353510.

External links
BBC News: Egypt debates controversial film
 

Egyptian LGBT-related films
2000s Arabic-language films
Films set in Cairo
Films based on Egyptian novels
Films directed by Marwan Hamed
2006 drama films
2006 films
Egyptian drama films
LGBT-related drama films
2006 LGBT-related films